The 2013 KNSB Dutch Single Distance Championships were held at the Thialf ice stadium in Heerenveen from 9 November until 11 November 2012. Although the tournament was held in 2012 it was the 2013 edition as it is part of the 2012/2013 speed skating season.

Schedule

Medalists

Men 

Men's results: Schaatsen.nl  & SchaatsStatistieken.nl

Women 

Women's results: Schaatsen.nl & SchaatsStatistieken.nl

References

External links
 KNSB

Dutch Single Distance Championships
Single Distance Championships
2013 Single Distance
KNSB Dutch Single Distance Championships, 2013